Tethea fusca is a moth in the family Drepanidae first described by Werny in 1966. It is found in the Chinese provinces of Sichuan and Yunnan.

References

Moths described in 1966
Thyatirinae